Edward "Charles" Dillon Jr. (born January 30, 1986) is a former American professional football player. Charles Dillon was raised in Ventura, California and learned to play football at an early age. He honed his talents on the Hueneme High School football team in Oxnard, California. During his teen years, Charles Dillon was a star in football, track, and basketball though his heart was most in the latter. Charles Dillon was a varsity letter winner four years on the football team despite playing a wide variety of positions. Due to his athleticism, Charles Dillon was a first-team All Pacific View League pick in 2003. He was specifically selected for his wide receiver skills that season after totaling over 700 receiving yards and 10 touchdowns. Dillon played his college career at Ventura College for his freshman and sophomore year, before transferring to Washington State University for junior and senior years.

Professional career

Indianapolis Colts

Dillon went undrafted in 2008, but shortly after the draft, he received a call from the Indianapolis Colts telling him that he had been signed.

Dillon had impressed the Colts, however his season came to an end fast due to an injury. He was placed on injured reserve and was cut by Indianapolis later on that season.

Green Bay Packers
The Green Bay Packers invited Dillon to attend training camp. On September 4, 2010, Dillon was released from the Packers.

Spokane Shock
In 2009, Dillon played arena football for the Spokane Shock of the af2 (the Arena Football League's former minor league). Dillon helped the Shock reach and win ArenaCup X with a victory over the Wilkes-Barre/Scranton Pioneers, winning 74–27.

Dillon signed with the Shock for the 2010 AFL season. However, while he was on the Packers' roster during training camp, the Shock placed him on its roster as 2010 AFL league exempt.

In early 2011, Dillon re-signed with the Shock.

Chicago Rush
Before the season began, Dillon was traded to the Chicago Rush. In 2011, he caught 96 passes for 1,200 yards and 24 touchdowns.

References

1986 births
Living people
American football wide receivers
Washington State Cougars football players
Indianapolis Colts players
Spokane Shock players
Chicago Rush players
People from Ventura, California
Players of American football from California
Green Bay Packers players
Sportspeople from Ventura County, California